Van Norman may refer to:

In people
 Amelie Veiller Van Norman (1844-1920), French-born American educator
 Daniel C. Van Norman (1815-1886), Canadian-born American educator, clergyman, and school founder
 Donald Van Norman Roberts (1927-2016), American engineer
 Harry C. Van Norman (1874-1929), U.S. politician
 Moriah van Norman (born 1984), American water polo player
 Tom Van Norman, American politician

In geography
 Van Norman Lake (Michigan), lake in the U.S. state of Michigan

Other
 Van Norman Dams, terminus of the Los Angeles Aqueduct
 Van Norman Institute, American girls' school in New York City.
 Van Norman Machine Tool Company, American machine tool builder